Baron Renfrew or Baron of Renfrew may refer to:

Baron of Renfrew (ship), a wooden ship
Baron of Renfrew (title), a subsidiary title of the Scottish and British heir apparent
Colin Renfrew, Baron Renfrew of Kaimsthorn, British archaeologist

See also
 Renfrew (disambiguation)